Francis Barrington "Barry" Hall (12 February 192114 November 2013) was an Australian public servant and diplomat.

Hall was the first Australian Ambassador to Iran when the Australian Government opened an embassy in Tehran in September 1968.

Between 1980 and 1984, Hall was Australian Ambassador to Turkey.

References

1921 births
2013 deaths
Ambassadors of Australia to Greece
Ambassadors of Australia to Iran
Ambassadors of Australia to Turkey